İlkadım Belediyesi Yabancılar Pazarı Spor is a women's football team based in İlkadım district of Samsun, Turkey. The club is chaired by Sezai Onaran, and its manager is Arif İmamoğlu.

History
After finishing the 2013–14 season in the Division 3 of Women's Second League undefeated, and winning the play-off match in the second leg against Ovacık Gençlik ve Spor, the team was promoted to play in the 2014–15 season of Women's First League.
Founded in 2010 by the municipality of İlkadım district as the women's football team of its multi-branch club İlkadım Belediyespor, the team changed its name in July 2014 after signing a sponsorship agreement with the trader's organization of Yabancılar Pazarı (literally: Foreigners' Market). The new leadership took over also the operation of the sports facility İlkadım Derebahçe Stadıum. They finished the 2014–15 season at 6th place. After a total of four seasons in the Women's First League, the team was relegated to the Second League at the end of the 2017–18 League  season. After two seasons in the Women's Second League, the team were promoted to the Women's First League againaccording to point average by decision of the Turkish Football Federation (TFF) as the season could not be completed due to the outbreak of the COVID-19 pandemic in Turkey.

Team name history  
 2010–2011 İlkadım Belediyespor
 2011–pres İlkadım Belediyesi Yabancılar Pazarı Spor

Stadium
İlkadım Belediyesi Yabancılar Pazarı Spor play their home matches at İlkadım Derebahçe Stadıum in Samsun.

Statistics
.

(1) Promoted after the incomplete season by TFF decision according to point average
(2) Did not show up in one match after the half time
(3) Season in progress

Current squad
.

Head coach:  Bünyamin Kubat

}

Former managers
  Bünyamin Kubat
  Arif İmamoğlu
  Akın Türker
  Sezai Onaran

Kit history

Squads

References

External links

 
2010 establishments in Turkey
Association football clubs established in 2010
Sport in Samsun